Dennyloanhead is a village in the Falkirk council area, Central Scotland, that is between Head of Muir and Longcroft. Dennyloanhead had a fingerpost announcing that it is 294 miles from John o' Groats. Old maps show it is 9 miles from Stirling and 5 miles from Falkirk.

Its main features include the Crown Hotel and Casserta's chip shop. There is another pub called the Railway Inn.

Notable residents
Notable people born or living in Dennyloanhead include Alex Totten (ex-manager of St Johnstone F.C & Falkirk F.C. football clubs).

Former residents include the eminent horticulturalist David Smiles Jerdan FRSE (1871-1951).

See also
Kilsyth and Bonnybridge railway

References

External links

Falkirk Local History Society - Dennyloanhead, Longcroft, Haggs, Banknock and Bankier

Villages in Falkirk (council area)